Cylicocyclus nassatus is a very common species of cyathostomin, which are important intestinal parasites of horses. Cyathostomins, including C. nassatus, are nematodes.

References

External links 
 INPN

Strongylida
Parasitic nematodes of mammals
Parasites of equines
Veterinary helminthology
Nematodes described in 1900